2014 Men's Volleyball Thai-Denmark Super League was the first edition of the tournament. It was held at the MCC Hall of The Mall Bangkapi in Bangkok, Thailand from 8 – 12 May 2014.

Teams
 Kasetsart
 Krungkao Air Force
 Chonburi
 Cosmo Chiang Rai
 Nakhon Ratchasima
 Suan Dusit

Pools composition

Preliminary round

Pool A

|}

|}

Pool B

|}

|}

Final round

Semifinals

|}

3rd place match

|}

Final

|}

Final standing

Awards 
 MVP:  Kittikun Sriutthawong (Chonburi E-Tech Air Force)

See also
 2014 Women's Volleyball Thai-Denmark Super League

References
 

 Results (Archived 2017-03-11)

Men's,2014
Volleyball,Men's Thai-Denmark Super League
Men's Thai-Denmark Super League